Emmanuel Joel Jose Villanueva (born August 2, 1975), nicknamed "Tesdaman", is a Filipino politician serving as the Senate Majority Leader since 2022 and has been a Senator since 2016. He previously served as the Director General of the Technical Education and Skills Development Authority (TESDA) from 2010 to 2015 in the administration of President Benigno Aquino III. He started his political career in the House of Representatives, representing CIBAC party-list from 2002 to 2010; he was the youngest member of the House when he assumed office, aged 26. He is a son of evangelist and politician Bro. Eddie Villanueva, founder of Jesus Is Lord Church Worldwide.

Villanueva is also a basketball player currently playing for the Senate Defenders in the UNTV Cup. He also played for the Philippine national team and the University of Santo Tomas.

Early life
Joel Villanueva was born on August 2, 1975, in Bocaue, Bulacan. He is the second of four children of the Philippine Christian evangelist Eddie Villanueva and Adoracion "Dory" Jose-Villanueva. He attended the University of Santo Tomas where he graduated in 1996 with a Bachelor of Science in Commerce degree, with a Major in Economics. He attended Harvard University in the United States for a Master in Business Administration from 1996 to 1998.

Career

Sports
While he was a student of the University of Santo Tomas, Villanueva played with the UST Growling Tigers varsity basketball team, that won the UAAP Season 56 and 57 of 1994–1995. Villanueva was part of the Philippines national basketball team that competed in international basketball competitions such as the inaugural 1994 SEABA Championship (coached by Virgil Villavicencio).

He returned to competitive basketball in 2013, playing for the Congress-LGU Legislators in the UNTV Cup. In 2014, he played for the Malacañang Patriots. After winning a Senate seat, Villanueva joined the Senate Defenders basketball team, in preparations for the opening of Season 5 of the UNTV Cup. He was part of the Defenders' championship team that won the UNTV Cup Season 6 in 2018.

Politics

CIBAC
Villanueva was elected to the Philippine House of Representatives in 2001 as a party-list representative of the Citizens' Battle Against Corruption (CIBAC). However, his oath-taking was stalled for seven months following issues that CIBAC was an extension of the Jesus Is Lord Church Worldwide, a Christian church founded by his father, Eddie Villanueva. At age 26, Villanueva took his oath of office in February 2002, becoming the youngest member of the House of Representatives (a distinction previously held by Felix William Fuentebella).

Villanueva was a member of the 12th, 13th, and 14th Congresses spanning 2001 through 2010. At the 12th Congress, he became the first party-list representative, minority leader of the House's Commission on Appointments, and assistant majority leader in the House. He was also among the principal sponsors of Republic Act No. 9485 (the Anti Red-Tape Law of 2007).  In the 13th Congress, he served as a deputy minority leader in the House.

TESDA

He was appointed by President Benigno Aquino III as TESDA chief in 2010. Upon assuming his post as head of TESDA, Villanueva initiated an audit of the agency stemming from a  sponsorship debt related to undocumented TESDA scholarships. The audit reduced the agency's debt to  after eliminating "ghost schools" and "ghost scholars".

As TESDA chief, he initiated the "Shoot for your Dream" series, an aspirational program which involved exhibition games featuring Philippine Basketball Association legends. Villanueva himself played as part of the basketball exhibition team, named "Team Trabaho".

Under his watch, TESDA's central office, as well as 17 regional offices and 81 provincial offices, were granted ISO certifications. Among these certifications included the office at the Autonomous Region in Muslim Mindanao, the first TESDA office to receive such a certification in Mindanao.

While in office as Director General of TESDA, he completed an extensive vocational course in Advanced Food and Beverage Services within the agency for training as a barista.

Prior to launching a senatorial bid, he tendered his resignation from the post on October 9, 2015. His resignation became effective on October 13, 2015, and President Benigno Aquino III named TESDA deputy director general Irene Isaac as his successor.

Senate
Villanueva ran for senator under the Koalisyon ng Daang Matuwid in the 2016 senatorial elections. He was also a shared candidate in the 10-member senatorial slate of the late presidential candidate Miriam Defensor Santiago. He filed his certificate of candidacy at the Commission on Elections on October 16, 2015. He unexpectedly won the Senate race, landing in second place with 18,459,222 votes.

Campaigning under the moniker "TESDA Man" (alternatively spelled as TESDAMAN) alluding to his previous experience as head of TESDA, Villanueva's platform is focused on employment. His platform is likewise abbreviated into TESDA – which stands for Trabaho, Edukasyon, Serbisyo, Dignidad and Asenso (Employment, Education, Service, Dignity and Progress).

On November 14, 2016, Ombudsman Conchita Carpio Morales ordered Villanueva's dismissal from public service for "grave misconduct, serious dishonesty, and conduct prejudicial to the interest of the service" over alleged misuse of his Priority Development Assistance Fund during his tenure as a congressman. Villanueva alleged that the incriminating documents were forged. Senate President Aquilino Pimentel III was directed by the Ombudsman to implement the order imposed against Villanueva.

Villanueva ran for re-election in the 2022 senatorial elections. Running as an independent candidate, he was named as a guest candidate of the Lacson–Sotto, MP3 Alliance, and TRoPa slates. He was successful, landing in the 9th place with 18,539,537 votes. He was later named Senate Majority Leader at the opening of the 19th Congress.

Personal life
He was given the Gawad Dangal ng Lipi for Public Service Award by the Bulacan provincial government on September 15, 2012. The Development Executive Group (DevEx) an organization based in the United States gave him the DEVEX Manila 40 Under 40 International Development Leaders Award on February 19, 2013. A former student of the University of Santo Tomas, he was named as Most Outstanding Alumni Award by the university.
He was granted an Honoris Causa degree of Doctor of Humanities by the Polytechnic University of the Philippines on May 10, 2013.

Villanueva has two children, Jaden and Gwyn. As a basketball enthusiast, Villanueva is reportedly a fan of the Boston Celtics of the National Basketball Association.

Villanueva formerly hosted the television program, Adyenda, and leads the Kristiyanong Kabataan para sa Bayan Movement, a youth organization.

References

External links
 

1975 births
21st-century Filipino politicians
Politicians from Bulacan
Senators of the 17th Congress of the Philippines
Senators of the 18th Congress of the Philippines
Heads of government agencies of the Philippines
Members of the House of Representatives of the Philippines for Citizens' Battle Against Corruption
Harvard Business School alumni
UST Growling Tigers basketball players
Living people
Philippines men's national basketball team players
Filipino men's basketball players
Basketball players from Bulacan
Benigno Aquino III administration personnel
Filipino Christians
Filipino evangelicals
Majority leaders of the Senate of the Philippines
Senators of the 19th Congress of the Philippines